Nestori Järvelä (18 April 1893 – 21 January 1951) was a Finnish middle-distance runner. He competed in the men's 3000 metres steeplechase at the 1924 Summer Olympics.

References

External links
 

1893 births
1951 deaths
Athletes (track and field) at the 1924 Summer Olympics
Finnish male middle-distance runners
Finnish male steeplechase runners
Olympic athletes of Finland
Place of birth missing